Ruppertshofen is a town in the district of Ostalbkreis in Baden-Württemberg in Germany.

References

Ostalbkreis